Dennis Okaru (born 5 December 1990) is a Nigerian football player who last played for Finnish Veikkausliiga side TPS.

External links
 

1990 births
Living people
Nigerian footballers
Turun Palloseura footballers
Veikkausliiga players
Nigerian expatriate footballers
Expatriate footballers in Finland
Association football wingers